Lost Money (French:L'argent par les fenêtres) is a 1933 French-language British comedy film directed by Norman Lee and starring Kid Berg, Judy Kelly and Julian Rose. It is the French-language version of the comedy Money Talks which had been made at Elstree Studios by British International Pictures.

Cast
 Kid Berg 
 Judy Kelly
 Julian Rose

References

Bibliography
 Low, Rachael. Filmmaking in 1930s Britain. George Allen & Unwin, 1985.
 Wood, Linda. British Films, 1927-1939. British Film Institute, 1986.

External links

1933 films
British comedy films
1933 comedy films
1930s French-language films
Films directed by Norman Lee
British multilingual films
British black-and-white films
1933 multilingual films
1930s British films